Hegge is a village in Øystre Slidre Municipality in Innlandet county, Norway. The village is located on a hillside overlooking the north shore of the lake Heggefjorden. The Norwegian County Road 51 runs through the village. The medieval Hegge Stave Church is located in the rural village.

References

Øystre Slidre
Villages in Innlandet